Sts. Cyril and Methodius Church may refer to 

In Slovenia:
Sts. Cyril and Methodius Church (Ljubljana)
In Poland:
 Sts. Cyril and Methodius Church (Wrocław)
In Croatia: 
 Greek Catholic Co-cathedral of Saints Cyril and Methodius, Zagreb
In Czechia:
 Saints Cyril and Methodius Cathedral, Prague
In the United States (by state):
Sts. Cyril and Methodius Church (Hartford, Connecticut), listed in the National Register of Historic Places
Sts. Cyril and Methodius Church (Shiner, Texas), listed in the National Register of Historic Places listings in Lavaca County, Texas